The Flyvefisken-class patrol vessels ("Flying fish" in Danish) are warships of the Royal Danish Navy. The class is also known as the Standard Flex 300 or SF300 class. The five vessels sold to the Portuguese Navy are locally referred as Tejo class.

Containerised weapon systems
The Flyvefisken ships were constructed using an innovative modular design known as StanFlex: they have a standard hull in which containerised weapons or systems can be placed. This allows them to rapidly change roles, typically in 48 hours. This enables the ships to be configured to perform the following roles:

 Surveillance/pollution control
 Combat
 Mine countermeasures/minehunter (MCM)
 Minelayer

The containers measure . One container is situated on the foredeck; the other three go on the quarterdeck behind the superstructure and funnel. Furthermore the ships are built using the sandwich principle - a layer of fiberglass either side of a core of PVC cell foam. This forms the structure from keel to top of mast. This building method reduces maintenance costs - so much so that 20 years later the new Diana and -Holm class have been built using the same materials.

Replaced three different vessels 
The Flyvefisken class replaced three different vessels in the Danish Navy: Six torpedo boats of the Søløven class (1965–90), six coastal minesweepers of the Sund class (1955–99) and eight seaward defence craft of the Daphne-class (1961–91). It was possible because of the containerised systems and modern technology.

The replaced vessels used World War II (or World War I) tactics: The Søløven boats were light plywood boats propelled by three turboshafts, which attacked the enemy ships with torpedoes in  hit-and-run attacks. The Flyvefisken class is not that fast, but their Harpoon missiles are sufficient for the task.

The  Sund-class minesweepers were built of wood, bronze and other non-magnetic materials. They swept mine fields by trawling through the area with paravanes on tow separating magnetic and acoustic generators for the bottom mines, and chain cutters for the horned mines. The Flyvefisken class is a minehunter and locates the mines with side-scan sonar and neutralizes them one by one with a ROV.

The Daphne class attacked submarines by dropping depth charges to a preselected depth, while sailing past the submarine. The Flyvefisken class fights submarines with anti-submarine homing torpedoes.

Ships in class
A total of 14 ships were built in the class, in three series:

The difference between the series is mainly in the configuration of the propulsion system. Series 2 is not equipped with hydraulic propulsion, but instead has an additional auxiliary engine, and Series 3 has one further auxiliary engine.

References

External links
 Danish Naval History
 Naval technology on Flyvefisken class

Patrol boat classes